Ding Dong Doggie is a 1937 Fleischer Studios animated short film starring Betty Boop.

Synopsis
Pudgy the Pup is impressed by a dalmatian fire dog he sees out his window. Against Betty Boop's orders, Pudgy accompanies the fire dog to a fire at a general store. Pudgy tries to help out, but the fire takes on a (animated) life of its own and gets the better of Pudgy. In the end, Pudgy is happy to run back home to Betty Boop who is not happy that Pudgy left and disobeyed her.

Notes
The fourth and last time Betty spanks Pudgy for punishment. She also spanked him in Betty Boop's Little Pal, Taking the Blame and We Did It.

References

External links
 Ding Dong Doggie on Youtube.
 
 Ding Dong Doggie at IMDb.

1937 short films
Betty Boop cartoons
1930s American animated films
American black-and-white films
1937 animated films
Paramount Pictures short films
Fleischer Studios short films
Short films directed by Dave Fleischer
Animated films about dogs
1930s English-language films
American animated short films